The 2015–16 season is Iraklis first season in the Super League since 2011 and 52nd in total.

Players
The following list contains Iraklis' squad, as it was after the conclusion of the summer transfer window.

First team

Transfers

In

Summer

Out

Summer

Club
Coaching staffOther information

Kit

|
|
|

Pre-season and friendlies
During pre-season Iraklis trained in Karpenisi and arranged friendly matches versus PAS Giannina, Panetolikos and Levadiakos. Iraklis agreed to play a friendly match with Italian Serie A club Fiorentina.  The match was agreed to be held at Stadio Mariotti in Montecatini Terme on 15 August.

Super League Greece

League table

Results summary

Results by round

Matches

Greek Cup

Second Round (Group A)

Third round

Statistics

Appearances and goals

Top scorers

Includes all competitive matches. The list is sorted by shirt number when total goals are equal.Top assists

Includes all competitive matches. The list is sorted by shirt number when total assists are equal.

Disciplinary record

Includes all competitive matches. The list is sorted by shirt number when total cards are equal.

References

Iraklis Thessaloniki F.C. seasons
Iraklis